was a Japanese microbiologist. In the 1930 
Shirota identified a strain of lactic acid bacteria that is part of normal gut flora that he originally called Lactobacillus casei Shirota, which appeared to help contain the growth of harmful bacteria in the gut. The strain was later reclassified as Lactobacillus paracasei Shirota.

He founded the company Yakult Honsha in 1935 to sell beverages containing the strain branded Yakult.

He died in Tokyo, Japan in 1982.

References 

1899 births
1982 deaths
Japanese military doctors
Japanese microbiologists
People from Iida, Nagano
Japanese inventors